Gleb Rassadkin (born 5 April 1995) is a Belarusian professional football player who plays for Smorgon.

External links
 
 
 Profile at Dinamo Minsk website

1995 births
Living people
Footballers from Minsk
Belarusian footballers
Association football forwards
Belarusian expatriate footballers
Expatriate footballers in Ukraine
Belarusian expatriate sportspeople in Ukraine
FC Dinamo Minsk players
FC Zirka Kropyvnytskyi players
FC Neman Grodno players
FC Vitebsk players
FC Arsenal Dzerzhinsk players
FC Smorgon players
Belarusian Premier League players
Ukrainian Premier League players